"The Deck of Cards" is a recitation song that was popularized in the fields of both country and popular music, first during the late 1940s. This song, which relates the tale of a young American soldier arrested and charged with playing cards during a church service, first became a hit in the U.S. in 1948 by country musician T. Texas Tyler.

Though Tyler wrote the spoken-word piece, the earliest known reference is to be found in an account/common-place book belonging to Mary Bacon, a British farmer's wife, dated 20 April 1762. The story of the soldier can be found in full in Mary Bacon's World. A farmer's wife in eighteenth-century Hampshire, published by Threshold Press (2010). The folk story was later recorded in a 19th-century British publication entitled The Soldier's Almanack, Bible And Prayer Book.

Story 
The song is set during World War II, where a group of U.S. Army soldiers, on a long hike during the North African campaign, arrive and camp near the town of Bizerte. While scripture is being read in church, one man who has only a deck of playing cards pulls them out and spreads them in front of him. He is immediately spotted by a sergeant, who believes the soldier is playing cards in church and orders him to put them away. The soldier is then arrested and taken before the provost marshal to be judged. The provost marshal demands an explanation and the soldier says that he had been on a long march, without a bible or a prayer book. He then explains the significance of each card:

Ace: one God.
Deuce: the Old Testament and New Testament in the Bible.
Trey (three): the Holy Trinity.
Four: St. Matthew, St. Mark, St. Luke, and St. John.
Five: the five wise virgins in the parable of the Ten Virgins.
Six: the number of days taken by God to create the earth according to the Genesis creation narrative.
Seven: the day on which God rested, now known as the Sabbath.
Eight: The people God saved during the Great Flood: Noah, his wife, their three sons and their wives.
Nine: out of the ten lepers cleansed by Jesus, according to the Gospel of Luke (see Luke 17:11-19), who did not thank Him.
Ten: the Ten Commandments handed down by Moses.
King: Jesus Christ; King of Kings, Lord of Lords.
Queen: Mary, the mother of Jesus.
Jack or knave: Satan or the Devil.
365 spots: the number of days in a year.
52 cards: the number of weeks in a year.
Thirteen tricks (in a game of whist or bridge) or values: the number of weeks in a season, or quarter of a year.
Four suits: the number of seasons in a year [in some versions: the number of weeks in a month]
Twelve face, picture or court cards: the number of months in a year.

He then ends his story by saying that "my pack of cards serves me as a Bible, an almanac, and a prayer book." The narrator then closes the story by stating that "this story is true," by claiming he was the soldier in question or that he knew/knows him.

The story as told contains an error in the number of days in a year. In a standard deck, there are 220 (4×(1+2+3+4+5+6+7+8+9+10)) spots on the pip cards and if it is assumed that the face cards have 11, 12 and 13 spots respectively, the total is 364. A single joker counting as one spot, however, would make 365. A version of the legend dating to 1865, cites the unreliability of existing almanacs as a justification for this apparent error.

Cover versions
T. Texas Tyler's rendition went to number 2 on the US country chart in 1948. A version by Tex Ritter later in the year reached number 10 on the same chart. Phil Harris also recorded a version in 1948 for RCA Victor.

The highest-charting version was recorded in 1959 by future game show host Wink Martindale, and was performed on The Ed Sullivan Show. Martindale's rendition (titled "Deck of Cards") went to No. 7 on the Billboard charts and number 11 on the country charts in 1959, attained multi-platinum recognition and reached No. 1 on many worldwide music charts.

Red Sovine released a version in 1967 called "Viet Nam Deck of Cards" on his album, Phantom 309.  Because the United States was involved in the Vietnam War at the time, Sovine's version modified the lyrics to have the soldier's story take place there, instead of the original World War II setting.  William York was credited for the updated lyrics on the album.

Bill Anderson released his version in January 1991 and it reached number 60 on the country chart. Because the United States was involved in the Gulf War at the time, Anderson's version modified the lyrics to have the soldier's story take place there, instead of World War II setting.  George Morgan was credited for the updated lyrics.

The song was also a UK No. 13 hit in October 1973 for the entertainer Max Bygraves.

The newly published edition of UK hit singles dating between 1940 and 1952, shows the song reaching number 2 for Phil Harris in January 1949.

A Dutch translation, "Het spel kaarten", recited by Cowboy Gerard (real name Gerard de Vries), was a hit in the Netherlands in 1965.

Magician Justin Flom created a magic effect, also based on the song, titled "Soldier's Deck of Cards" which was seen by over five million people online.

A Czech version of this song was recorded on 9 October 1969 in Studio Smečky by singer Miroslav Černý and the band Rangers (Plavci) under the Czech title "Balíček karet".

In 1974, there was a version in German by Bruce Low.

A Finnish translation, "Korttipakka", by Tapio Rautavaara was published in 1976.

Parodies 
Red River Dave composed a parody, "The Red Deck of Cards" about a U.S. prisoner of war, who hates cards, because the North Koreans tried to teach him Communism by using a deck of cards.
Bill Oddie performed a parody version written by Tim Brooke-Taylor and Chris Stuart-Clark, about a cricket bag in I'm Sorry, I'll Read That Again. This same version was also performed by David Frost and released as a single by Parlophone in 1966 with Chris Stuart-Clarke's name being misspelled as Stewart-Clarke. A Parlophone promotional single released on 29 April 1966, exists which has a John Cleese sketch titled "Zoo Keeper" as the A-side, but versions are also found with "Deck of Cards" as the A-side.
The Soft Boys with Robyn Hitchcock also recorded a parody version, originally an outtake from Live At The Portland Arms. It was released as a bonus flexi-disc with Bucketfull of Brains magazine #23.

References

External links
 Mary Bacon's World
 Urban Legends

1948 songs
1959 singles
T. Texas Tyler songs
Tex Ritter songs
Bill Anderson (singer) songs
Wink Martindale songs
Max Bygraves songs
Recitation songs
Spoken word
Songs based on the Bible
Songs about soldiers